Deva-Vatala National Park is a protected area in Bhimber District, Azad Kashmir, Pakistan. It is located close to the Indian border and aligns with the district of Gujrat. The park is one of the few protected areas in Azad Kashmir to be located in a thorn forest. It is home to some of the most diverse wildlife, including the only population of Red Junglefowl, in Pakistan.

History 
This national park was notified in 1998 and spreads over an area of 7,000 hectares which is around 29km2.
It was part of India until 1971.

Geography 
The park is an important hotspot for biodiversity and has many lakes which attract waterfowl. It is a hilly area with a maximum height of 1,101m above sea level. It is part of the Lower Himalayan Range, and is mainly covered by tropical thorn forest.

Flora 
The forest is mainly tropical thorn covered by Acacia and many evergreen trees with diverse shrub growth. The climate is mainly sem-arid.

Fauna 
Deva Vatala National Park is home to many mammals, birds and reptiles. 

Mammals in the park include:
Indian leopard, "P.p.fusca"
Golden jackal, C. a. indica
Indian grey mongoose, H. e. edwardsii
Small Indian civet, V. indica
Cape hare, L. c. isabellinus
Wild boar, S. s. scrofa
Nilgai, B. tragocamelus
Hog deer, A. porcinus
Indian porcupine, H. i. blandfordi

Significant birds:
Indian peafowl, P. cristatus
Red junglefowl, G. gallus
Black francolin, F. francolinus
Grey francolin, F. pondicerianus
Mallard, A. platyrhynchos
Northern shoveler, S. clypeata
Eurasian coot, F. atra

Reptiles:
Indian python, P. molurus
King cobra, O. hannah
Bengal monitor, V. bengalensis

References

Protected areas of Azad Kashmir
National parks of Pakistan
Bhimber District
1998 establishments in Pakistan